The 97th Infantry Division was a unit of the United States Army in World War I and World War II. Nicknamed the "Trident division" because of its shoulder patch, a vertical trident in white on a blue background, it was originally trained in amphibious assaults as preparation for deployment in the Pacific Theater. It was deployed to Europe in 1944 when casualties from the Battle of the Bulge needed to be replaced.

World War I

The 97th Division was one of the divisions planned to be activated in late 1918 and deployed to France in 1919 to reinforce the American Expeditionary Force. The division was organized at Camp Cody, Deming, New Mexico and activated on 5 September 1918. It included the 193rd and 194th Infantry Brigades, and the 172nd Field Artillery Brigade. The 194th was to be organized and trained at Camp Cody, the 172nd at Camp Jackson, South Carolina, and the 193rd was to be organized in France with the AEF. The division's cadre consisted of over 1,000 trained officers and enlisted men, and Colonel Carl A. Martin became its first commander on 26 September.

The division was intended to be composed of National Army draftees mainly from Maine, Vermont and New Hampshire, but in October, over 5,000 draftees, mainly from Oklahoma and Minnesota, were sent to the division at Camp Cody. Initial instruction at Camp Cody went relatively well, but the 172nd Brigade's training at Camp Jackson was delayed by a lack of personnel. Its regiments were at less than half-strength as late as the beginning of November. In late October, the 97th was struck by the 1918 flu pandemic, which sickened over 500 soldiers and killed more than 100. On 25 October, Brigadier General James R. Lindsay became division commander as Martin became its chief of staff. The war ended with the Armistice of 11 November, and the 97th was ordered to be demobilized on 20 November. At the time, it was only partially organized and consisted of 402 officers and 7,889 men. The demobilization was completed on 22 December/

Neptune's trident was originally adopted as the division's symbol, to represent the coastal states of Maine, Vermont and New Hampshire, from which the first recruits were drawn in 1918. The three prongs of the trident represent the three states, the blue symbolizes the states' numerous fresh water lakes, and the white of the border and trident represents the snow that covers these states' mountains.

Composition
Division Headquarters
387th Infantry Regiment
388th Infantry Regiment
622nd Field Signal Battalion
366th Machine Gun Battalion
322nd Headquarters Train and Military Police
322nd Sanitary Train

172nd Field Artillery Brigade

The brigade was organized at Camp Jackson, South Carolina, under the command of Brigadier General Dennis H. Currie.

61st Field Artillery Regiment
62nd Field Artillery Regiment
63rd Field Artillery Regiment
21st Trench Mortar Battery
322nd Ammunition Train

Commanders
Colonel C. A. Martin - 26 September 1918 to 19 October 1918;
Brigadier General James R. Lindsay - 19 October 1918 until demobilization on 20 November 1918.

Interwar period

The division was reconstituted in the Organized Reserves on 24 June 1921 and assigned to the states of New Hampshire, Maine, and Vermont. The headquarters was organized in December 1921.

World War II

The 97th Infantry Division was ordered into active military service during World War II on 25 February 1943 at Camp Swift, Texas, the last of the Organized Reserve infantry divisions to enter active duty. Because the activation rate of Army units in late 1942 was proceeding faster than the expected induction rate of new soldiers and there was an urgent need for personnel to participate in the Operation Torch landings in North Africa planned for November 1942, the reorganization of the 97th was deferred until early 1943 and three partially-trained divisions were stripped to less than 50 percent strength. Most of the cadre for the 97th came from the 95th Infantry Division stationed at Fort Sam Houston, Texas. In February 1944 the division was moved to Fort Leonard Wood, Missouri, for additional training. During 1944, approximately 5,000 soldiers were stripped from the division and sent as replacements to other units in Europe. Division strength was eventually restored when the Army Specialized Training Program and aviation cadet training program were sharply reduced or terminated and many of their personnel were reassigned to Army Ground Forces for retraining as infantry.

In July 1944 the division relocated to Camp San Luis Obispo, California. Under the supervision of the Navy and Marine Corps, the division began amphibious training and exercises at Camp Callan, Coronado Strand, San Clemente Island, San Nicolas Island and Camp Pendleton. In September 1944 the 97th was transferred to Camp Cooke, California, for further amphibious training.

In early January 1945, General Dwight D. Eisenhower, the Supreme Commander of Allied forces on the Western Front, was alarmed over the swift progress the Germans had made during the waning Battle of the Bulge and was concerned that the Germans could move additional reinforcements to the west from the Eastern Front. He requested additional divisions over and above those already earmarked for the European theater. The 86th and 97th Infantry Divisions, allocated for service in the Pacific, were ordered to the European Theater of Operations (ETO) instead for the final assault on Germany. The strength of the division upon deployment in Europe was 600 officers and 14,000 men.

Overseas: 19 February 1945 for the ETO;
Returned to U.S.: 16 June 1945, from the ETO
Overseas: 28 August 1945, for the Pacific Theater, arriving 25 September 1945 in Yokohama, Japan
Campaigns: Central Europe
Days of combat: 41 (ETO)
Prisoners of war taken in the ETO: 48,796
Inactivated: 31 March 1946 in Japan

Casualties
Total battle casualties: 979
Killed in action: 188
Wounded in action: 721
Missing in action: 9
Prisoner of war: 61

Awards
Medal of Honor - 1 (Joe R. Hastings)
Distinguished Service Cross (United States) - 1
Distinguished Service Medal (U.S. Army) - 1
Silver Star - 61
Legion of Merit - 2 (A. James Faulkner and Robie Macauley)
Soldier's Medal - 3
Bronze Star − 206

Composition

 Headquarters, 97th Infantry Division
 303rd Infantry Regiment
 386th Infantry Regiment
 387th Infantry Regiment
 Headquarters and Headquarters Battery, 97th Infantry Division Artillery
303rd Field Artillery Battalion (105 mm)
365th Field Artillery Battalion (105 mm)
922nd Field Artillery Battalion (105 mm)
389th Field Artillery Battalion (155 mm)
 322nd Engineer Combat Battalion
 322nd Medical Battalion
 97th Cavalry Reconnaissance Troop (Mechanized)
 Headquarters, Special Troops, 97th Infantry Division
 Headquarters Company, 97th Infantry Division
 797th Ordnance Light Maintenance Company
 97th Quartermaster Company
 597th Signal Company
 97th Military Police Platoon
 97th Infantry Division Band
 97th Counterintelligence Corps Detachment

Commanders
Major General Louis A. Craig - 4 February 1943 to 19 January 1944
Brigadier General Milton B. Halsey - 20 January 1944 – 24 September 1945
Major General Herman F. Kramer - 24 September 1945 to inactivation on 31 March 1946.

Combat chronicle
After assembly and training at Camp Cooke in California, the 97th Infantry Division was transported by train to Camp Kilmer, New Jersey. The division embarked on troopships in New York and landed at Le Havre, France on 2 March 1945, then moved to Camp Lucky Strike. After crossing France by troop train, the division passed through Maastricht and crossed the German border west of Aachen on 28 March, taking up a defensive position along the west bank of the Rhine River opposite Düsseldorf. As all bridges over the Rhine had been destroyed and the city was well-defended, the 97th was ordered to move south along the west bank of the Rhine, crossing over it near Bonn on 3 April and taking up a position on the southern bank of the Sieg River at Hennef.

Ruhr pocket
The division then entered the battle of the Ruhr pocket, crossing the Sieg River on 7 April, battling German Wehrmacht troops defending Schloss Allner. According to the after action report:
"Machine-gun fire was strafing the crossing area from castle near ALLNER where it had a clear field of fire and from a wooded spur at a bend in the river W of the crossing, firing upriver toward the boats. Artillery fire, TD's, heavy MG fire and mortars were all brought to bear on this castle but although it crumbled, the MG fire continued. Fire was also coming from the high ground N of the river."

In two days the 922nd Field Artillery Battalion fired over three thousand rounds at the area around the castle. Pfc John Hedrick seized an abandoned assault boat while under heavy enemy fire and used the craft to help ferry troops across the river. He was awarded the Silver Star. After crossing the river, elements of the 387th Infantry Regiment assaulted the castle:

"The 2d Battalion hit very stiff resistance at the ALLNER Castle and on the ridge in the loop of the river. Anti-tank company and the TD's blasted the castle from the S bank of the SIEG River and G Company was able to clear it out."

Entering Siegburg on 10 April, troops again encountered heavy resistance at the Glockner works.

On 12 April Pfc Joe R. Hastings of Company C, 386th Infantry Regiment, distinguished himself in action at Drabenderhöhe, Germany while attacking an enemy position. According to his citation:
"[Hastings] rushed forward over 350 yards of open, rolling fields to reach a position from which he could fire on the enemy troops. From this vantage point he killed the crews of a 20mm gun and a machine gun, drove several enemy riflemen from their positions, and so successfully shielded the 1st Platoon that it had time to reorganize and remove its wounded to safety. Observing that the 3d Platoon to his right was being met by very heavy 40mm and machine gun fire, he ran 150 yards with his gun to the leading elements of that unit, where he killed the crew of the 40mm gun...[He then] advanced, firing his gun held at hip height, disregarding the bullets that whipped past him, until the assault had carried 175 yards to the objective...He was killed 4 days later while again supporting the 3d Platoon."

He received the Medal of Honor posthumously for his actions.

On 14 April, intelligence officers from the 97th Division liberated approximately 800 prisoners of war, including 177 Americans, being held at a POW camp in Hoffnungstal, near Much, Germany.

Pushing on toward Düsseldorf through difficult terrain and heavy resistance in densely wooded areas, the division captured Solingen on 17 April. Düsseldorf fell without much fighting the next day, after the German Resistance launched Aktion Rheinland, and the Ruhr pocket was eliminated by 21 April.

Flossenbürg concentration camp
On 23 April elements of the 97th, together with members of the 90th Infantry Division, liberated Flossenbürg concentration camp near Floß in Bavaria. A military police patrol from the 303rd Infantry Regiment may have been the first U.S. Army unit to reach the camp, although the 2nd Cavalry Group, Mechanized and a colonel from the 90th Infantry Division later took credit for liberating the camp. Members of the 97th Division treated sick and dying prisoners and buried the several hundred corpses discovered in the camp. Brigadier General Milton B. Halsey inspected the camp as did General Sherman V. Hasbrouck, the commanding officer of the division artillery. Members of the Counter Intelligence Corps, which included Robie Macauley, Ib Melchior and Anthony Hecht, interviewed former prisoners and gathered evidence for trials of former camp officers and guards. The 97th also liberated Helmbrechts concentration camp, a sub-camp of Flossenbürg for female prisoners.

The following day a unit of the 97th CIC Detachment led by Captain Oscar M. Grimes captured about two hundred Gestapo officers and men in hiding near Hof, Bavaria. They were in possession of American uniforms and equipment, but had evidently made the decision to surrender.

Czechoslovakia
On 25 April the division entered Czechoslovakia, moving to protect the left flank of the Third Army on its southern drive. The 97th took Cheb, Czechoslovakia, on 25 April 1945 and attacked the Czechoslovak pocket near Weiden, Germany on 29 April. It had advanced to Konstantinovy Lázně, Czechoslovakia, when it received the ceasefire order on 7 May. Part of the division was in Teplá where the German 2nd Panzer Division had surrendered. The troops used the monastery there as a POW camp for the Germans.

The 97th Infantry Division was credited with firing the last official shot in the European Theatre of Operations during World War II. This shot was fired by Pfc. Domenic Mozzetta (1925-2001) of Company B, 387th Infantry Regiment, 97th Infantry Division, at a German sniper near Klenovice, Czechoslovakia shortly before midnight, 7 May 1945.

Assignments in the ETO
30 January 1945: Fifteenth Army, 12th Army Group
28 March 1945: XXII Corps
1 April 1945: First Army, 12th Army Group
10 April 1945: XVIII (Abn) Corps
19 April 1945: Third Army, 12th Army Group
22 April 1945: XII Corps
28 April 1945: First Army, 12th Army Group
30 April 1945: V Corps
6 May 1945: Third Army, 12th Army Group

Command posts in the ETO
2 Mar 45 - Camp Lucky Strike, Seine-Inferieure, France
28 Mar 45 - Lövenich, Rhineland, Germany
31 Mar 45 - Glehn, Rhineland, Germany
4 Apr 45 - Oberpleis, Rhineland, Germany
12 Apr 45 - Siegburg, Rhineland, Germany
14 Apr 45 - Rosrath, Rhineland, Germany
15 Apr 45 - Bergisch Gladbach, Rhineland, Germany
17 Apr 45 - Solingen, Rhineland, Germany
21 Apr 45 - Hof, Bavaria, Germany
23 Apr 45 - Wunsiedel, Bavaria, Germany
29 Apr 45 - Weiden in der Oberpfalz, Bavaria, Germany
5 May 45 - Tachov, Bohemia, Czechoslovakia
7 May 45 - Konstantinovy Lázně, Bohemia, Czechoslovakia
9 May 45 - Tachov, Bohemia, Czechoslovakia
15 May 45 - Memmelsdorf, Bavaria, Germany
1 Jun 45 - Camp Old Gold, Seine-Inferieure, France

Post-war duties
Arriving at Yokohama on 25 September 1945, the division relieved the 43rd Infantry Division and established its headquarters at Mitsugahara Airfield in Kumagaya. By December the 97th had reached its maximum deployment through six prefectures: Saitama, Gunma, Nagano, Niigata, Fukushima, and Tochigi.

Confiscating and disposing of Japanese military property proved to be the Division's prime task. The 97th returned 198,142,046 pounds of foodstuffs, 670,226 gallons of gasoline, 8,568,857 yards of cloth and 480,343 pairs of boots and shoes to the Japanese government for distribution to civilians.

On 26 October counter-intelligence officers from the 97th Division located $2.5 million worth of stolen radium in the German consulate in Osaka, and another $3 million in silver bullion in a warehouse in Iida, Nagano. On 31 October, Special Agent Robie Macauley of the division's counter-intelligence unit arrested 26 prominent Nazis who were in hiding in Karuizawa.

The division was inactivated on 31 March 1946 in Yokohama.

Command posts in Japan
25 Sep 45 - Mitsugahara Airfield in Kumagaya, Saitama, Japan
7 Oct 45 - Ueda, Nagano, Japan

Cold War to present

On 15 July 1962, the division's 97th Cavalry Reconnaissance Troop was converted and redesignated, less the 3rd Platoon, as the Headquarters and Headquarters Company, 193rd Infantry Brigade, and relieved from assignment to the 97th Infantry Division. Concurrently, it was withdrawn from the Army Reserve and allotted to the Regular Army. 

The 3rd Platoon, 97th Cavalry Reconnaissance Troop was concurrently converted and redesignated as the Headquarters and Headquarters Company, 194th Infantry Brigade - hereafter separate lineage). The unit was reactivated shortly thereafter on 8 August 1962 in the Panama Canal Zone.

On 22 December 1967, the 97th Army Reserve Command was activated at Fort Meade, Maryland. While the 97th ARCOM was allowed to wear the shoulder sleeve insignia of the 97th Infantry Division and use its number, Department of the Army policy does not allow for the lineage of Table of Organization and Equipment (TOE) units, such as infantry divisions, to be perpetuated by Table of Distribution (TDA) units, such as ARCOMs.

Three medical units of the 97th were mobilized and deployed to South Vietnam during the Vietnam War.

In U.S. military Operations in Panama to oust dictator Manuel Noriega in 1989, the 97th deployed troops to neutralize key Panamanian Defense Forces positions on the Pacific side of the Canal Zone; civil affairs soldiers from the 97th later assisted in rebuilding the new Government of Panama.

During operations Desert Shield and Desert Storm, more than 3,000 division troops deployed to missions in the Persian Gulf.

In 1996, as part of the overall force reduction following the end of the Cold War, the 97th Army Reserve Command was inactivated and its units were absorbed into the 99th Regional Readiness Command.

Years later the lineage of the 97th Infantry Division was reactivated as the 97th Training Brigade, a subordinate unit of the 100th Training Division.

See also
The Army Almanac: A Book of Facts Concerning the Army of the United States U.S. Government Printing Office, 1950.
Command structure, statistics and other details about the 97th Inf Div
The 97th Infantry Division During World War II

References

Citations

Bibliography 
 

097th Infantry Division, U.S.
Infantry Division, U.S. 097
Military units and formations established in 1918
United States Army divisions of World War I
Infantry divisions of the United States Army in World War II
1918 establishments in New Mexico
Military units and formations disestablished in 1946